Francesco Cavalli (born Pietro Francesco Caletti-Bruni; 14 February 1602 – 14 January 1676) was a Venetian composer, organist and singer of the early Baroque period. He succeeded his teacher Claudio Monteverdi as the dominant and leading opera composer of the mid 17th-century. A central figure of Venetian musical life, Cavalli wrote more than forty operas, almost all of which premiered in the city's theaters. His best known works include Ormindo (1644), Giasone (1649) and La Calisto (1651).

Life
Cavalli was born at Crema, then an inland province of the Venetian Republic. He became a singer (boy soprano) at St Mark's Basilica in Venice in 1616, where he had the opportunity to work under the tutorship of Claudio Monteverdi.  He became second organist in 1639, first organist in 1665, and in 1668 maestro di cappella. He took the name "Cavalli" from his patron, Venetian nobleman Federico Cavalli. Though he wrote prolifically for the church, he is chiefly remembered for his operas. He began to write for the stage in 1639 (Le nozze di Teti e di Peleo) soon after the first public opera house opened in Venice, the Teatro San Cassiano. He established so great a reputation that he was summoned to Paris from 1660 (when he revived his opera Xerse) until 1662, producing his Ercole amante. He died in Venice at the age of 73.

Music and influence
Cavalli was the most influential composer in the rising genre of public opera in mid-17th-century Venice. Unlike Monteverdi's early operas, scored for the extravagant court orchestra of Mantua, Cavalli's operas make use of a small orchestra of strings and basso continuo to meet the limitations of public opera houses.

Cavalli introduced melodious arias into his music and popular types into his libretti. His operas have a remarkably strong sense of dramatic effect as well as a great musical facility, and a grotesque humour which was characteristic of Italian opera down to the death of Alessandro Scarlatti. Cavalli's operas provide the only example of a continuous musical development of a single composer in a single genre from the early to the late 17th century in Venice — only a few operas by others (e.g., Monteverdi and Antonio Cesti) survive. The development is particularly interesting to scholars because opera was still quite a new medium when Cavalli began working, and had matured into a popular public spectacle by the end of his career.

Cavalli wrote forty-one operas, twenty-seven of which are extant, being preserved in the Biblioteca Nazionale Marciana (Library of St Mark) in Venice. Copies of some of the operas also exist in other locations. In addition, two last operas (Coriolano and Masenzio), which are clearly attributed to him, are lost, as well as twelve other operas that have been attributed to him, though the music is lost and attribution impossible to prove.

In addition to operas, Cavalli wrote settings of the Magnificat in the grand Venetian polychoral style, settings of the Marian antiphons, other sacred music in a more conservative manner – notably a Requiem Mass in eight parts (SSAATTBB), probably intended for his own funeral – and some instrumental music.

Sacred works

 Musiche sacre concernenti messa, e salmi concertati con istromenti, imni, antifone et sonate (Venecia, 1656).
 Messa, 8vv, 2 vn, vc, otros instrumentos ad libitum ed. R. Leppard (Londres, 1966).
 Alma redemptoris mater, 2 S, A, T, B, ed. B. Stäblein, Musica divina, iv (Regensburg, 1950).
 Ave maris stella, A, T, B.
 Ave regina caelorum, T, B, ed. B. Stäblein, Musica divina, i (Regensburg, 1950).
 Beatus vir, A, T, B, 2 vn, vc.
 Confitebor tibi Domine, 8vv, 2 vn, vc
 Credidi, 2 S, A, T, B, 2 vn, vc
 Deus tuorum militum, A, T, B, 2 vn, vc
 Dixit Dominus, 8vv, 2 vn, vc, other insts ad lib
 Domine probasti, S, A, B, 2 vn, vc
 Exultet orbis, 4vv, 2 vn, vc
 In convertendo, 2 S, A, T, B
 Iste confessor, 2 S, 2 vn, vc
 Jesu corona virginum, A, T, B, 2 vn, vc
 Laetatus sum, A, T, B, 2 vn, 3 va, ed. R. Leppard (London, 1969)
 Lauda Jerusalem, 8vv, 2 vn, vc, other insts ad lib
 Laudate Dominum, 8vv, 2 vn, vc, ed. R. Leppard (London, 1969)
 Laudate pueri, 2 S, A, T, B, 2 vn, vc
 Magnificat, 8vv, 2 vn, vc, other insts ad lib, ed. R. Leppard (London, 1969)
 Nisi Dominus, 4vv, 2 vn, vc
 Regina caeli, A, T, B, ed. B. Stäblein, Musica divina, ii (Regensburg, 1950)
 Salve regina, A, 2 T, B, ed. B. Stäblein, Musica divina, iii (Regensburg, 1950)
 Canzoni [sonate] a 3, 4, 6, 8, 10, 12; a 6 y a 12 ed. R. Nielsen (Bologna, 1955)
 Vesperi, 8vv, bc (Venice, 1675)
 Vespero della B.V. Maria: Dixit Dominus; Laudate pueri; Laetatus sum; Nisi Dominus; Lauda Jerusalem; Magnificat. ed. G. Piccioli (Milan, 1960); ed. F. Bussi (Milan, 1995)
 Vespero delle domeniche: Dixit Dominus; Confitebor; Beatus vir; Laudate pueri; In exitu Israel; Laudate Dominum; Credidi; In convertendo; Domine probasti; Beati omnes; De profundis; Memento; Confitebor angelorum; Magnificat, ed. G. Piccioli (Milan, 1960); all ed. F. Bussi (Milan, 1995)
 Vespero delle cinque Laudate ad uso della cappella di S Marco: Laudate pueri; Laudate Dominum laudate eum; Lauda anima mea; Laudate Dominum quoniam bonus; Lauda Jerusalem; Magnificat, ed. G. Piccioli (Milan, 1960); all ed. F. Bussi (Milan, 1995)
 Cantate Domino, 1v, bc, 16252; ed. F. Vatielli, Antiche cantate spirituali (Turin, 1922)
 O quam suavis, 1v, bc, 16453
 Magnificat, 6vv, 2 vn, bc, 16505; ed. F. Bussi (Milan, 1988)
 In virtute tua, 3vv, bc, 16561
 O bone Jesu, 2vv, bc, 16561
 Plaudite, cantate, 3vv, bc, 16561
 Missa pro defunctis [Requiem], 8vv, bc, D-Bsb, Dlb; ed. F. Bussi (Milan, 1978)

Operas

Modern performances
Cavalli's music was revived in the twentieth century. The Glyndebourne production of La Calisto is an example. More recently, Hipermestra was performed at Glyndebourne in 2017.
The discography is extensive and Cavalli has featured in BBC Radio 3's Composer of the Week series.

See also
Music of Venice

References

Further reading
Bukofzer, Manfred, Music in the Baroque Era. New York: W. W. Norton & Company, 1947. 
Glixon, Beth L. and Jonathan E., Inventing the Business of Opera: The Impresario and His World in Seventeenth-Century Venice. Oxford: Oxford University Press, 2006. 
Glover, Jane, Cavalli. London: Palgrave Macmillan, 1978. 
Rosand, Ellen, Opera in Seventeenth-Century Venice. Berkeley:University of California Press, 1991.  
Selfridge-Field, Eleanor, Venetian Instrumental Music, from Gabrieli to Vivaldi. New York: Dover Publications, 1994. 
Rismondo, Paolo A., Pietro Francesco Caletti Bruni detto il Cavalli: tappe per una biografia

External links

1602 births
1676 deaths
17th-century Italian composers
Catholic liturgical composers
Italian Baroque composers
Italian male classical composers
Italian opera composers
Male opera composers
People from Crema, Lombardy
Musicians from the Province of Cremona
17th-century male musicians